Dyschirius importunus is a species of ground beetle in the subfamily Scaritinae. It was described by Schaum in 1857.

References

importunus
Beetles described in 1857